Stephanie Gaumnitz (née Pohl; born 21 October 1987) is a German retired racing cyclist. She rode at the 2014 UCI Road World Championships. At the 2015 UCI Track Cycling World Championships she won the gold medal in the points race.

In September 2015 the  announced that she would join them for the 2016 season. After two seasons she ended her career in September 2017.

Major results
2012
1st Points Race, UEC European Track Championships
2014
2nd Points Race, UCI Track World Championships
3rd Omnium, Grand Prix of Poland
2015
1st Points Race, UCI Track World Championships
3rd Points Race, UEC European Track Championships
1st Overall Rás na mBan Tour of Ireland
2016
3rd Team Time Trial, UCI Road World Championships
2017
3rd Team Time Trial, UCI Road World Championships

References

External links
 

1987 births
Living people
German female cyclists
Sportspeople from Cottbus
Olympic cyclists of Germany
Cyclists at the 2016 Summer Olympics
Cyclists from Brandenburg
People from Bezirk Cottbus
20th-century German women
21st-century German women